William G. Fricke House is a home by American architect, Frank Lloyd Wright, in Oak Park, Illinois, United States. Fricke commissioned the home in 1901 and it was finished the next year. Wright used elements in the building that would appear in his Prairie style homes: a high water table, horizontal banding, overhanging eaves, shallow hipped roofs, and an exterior with an expansive amount of stucco. Wright usually emphasized the horizontal in his house designs, but the Fricke house is different by having a three-story tower.

The house has been owned since 2004 by Dawn and Ed McGee.

References 

 Storrer, William Allin. The Frank Lloyd Wright Companion. University Of Chicago Press, 2006,  (S.058)

Further reading

External links 

 The Fricke House at the Frank Lloyd Wright Trust

Frank Lloyd Wright buildings
Buildings and structures in Cook County, Illinois
1902 establishments in Illinois
Houses completed in 1902
Oak Park, Illinois